Town Shoes Ltd. was a Canadian chain of shoe stores founded by Leonard Simpson in 1952. It had 30 locations across Canada.

Timeline
In 2014, DSW, Inc., now Designer Brands, Inc., acquired a 44% stake in Town Shoes. 

In May 2018, DSW purchased the remainder of the company. 

On August 28, 2018, DSW announced the closure of all 38 locations, due to competition from other retailers.

References

External links
Nice Kicks Shop
Quality Rep Shoes

Retail companies established in 1952
Retail companies disestablished in 2019
Shoe companies of Canada
1952 establishments in Ontario
2019 disestablishments in Ontario
Canadian companies established in 1952
Canadian companies disestablished in 2019